Pat Kavanagh (born March 14, 1979) is a Canadian former professional ice hockey right winger who played in the National Hockey League (NHL) for the Vancouver Canucks and Philadelphia Flyers.

Playing career
Kavanagh was drafted in the 2nd round, 50th overall, by the Philadelphia Flyers in the 1997 NHL Entry Draft.

On January 31, 2007, Kavanagh signed with the HV71 of the Elitserien for the rest of the 2006–07 season after having played the early part of the season for SaiPa of the SM-liiga and two games with the Portland Pirates of the AHL. Kavanagh played for the Iserlohn Roosters in 2007–08 and after a good season he moved on to the Frankfurt Lions. He spent only a season there before moving to ERC Ingolstadt.

In the 2010–11 season, Kavanagh returned to sign a one-year contract with Iserlohn on July 9, 2010.

On June 21, 2011, Kavanagh switched European leagues, signing a one-year contract with the Vienna Capitals of the EBEL.

Career statistics

References

External links
 

1979 births
Binghamton Senators players
Canadian expatriate ice hockey players in Finland
Canadian expatriate ice hockey players in Germany
Canadian expatriate ice hockey players in Sweden
Canadian ice hockey right wingers
ERC Ingolstadt players
Frankfurt Lions players
HC Pustertal Wölfe players
HV71 players
Ice hockey people from Ottawa
Iserlohn Roosters players
Kansas City Blades players
Living people
Manitoba Moose players
Peterborough Petes (ice hockey) players
Philadelphia Flyers draft picks
Philadelphia Flyers players
Philadelphia Phantoms players
SaiPa players
Syracuse Crunch players
Vancouver Canucks players
Vienna Capitals players